Nanook's Great Hunt (French: La Grande Chasse de Nanook) is a 1996 animated series of 26 episodes. It was co-produced by Elma Animation, Medver International Inc., and TF1, in association with Mediatoon. The series was created and produced by Serge Rosenzweig; the directors were Franck Bourgeron, Marc Perret, and Stéphane Roux; the executive producers were Paul Rozenberg, Dana Hastier, and Lyse Lafontaine; the writers were Françoise Charpiat, Sophie Decroisette and Serge Rosenzweig; music was by Xavier Cobo and Michaël Dune. The series first aired in France on Wednesday September 3, 1997, on TF1's TF! Jeunesse. It also aired in Canada in French on Mondays at 8pm on Télétoon, and in English on Teletoon on Thursdays at 4:55pm. A 70-minute special titled Nanook: le grand combat/Nanook - The Great Combat was produced in 1996 as well. The special was directed by Gérald Fleury.

In February 2000, APTN (Aboriginal Peoples Television Network) started airing Nanook on Saturday mornings in Inuktitut. It was the first animated series to be aired in Nunavik dialects.

Synopsis
From Mediatoon's press flyer:
"A boy's journey into manhood through his quest to find his missing father... Set in the harsh landscape of the Canadian Arctic, this enchanting tale evolves around Nanook, a twelve-year-old Inuit boy, who embarks upon a journey to find his missing father, undertaking the challenge of hunting down the mythical bear, Suaq Nanok."

Episodes
A total of 26 episodes of 26 minutes were produced, plus a 70-minute special titled Nanook - The Great Combat. Currently the first two episodes are available for free at eToon on Dailymotion.
A list of the French title of the episodes is available at Planète Jeunesse.

Voice artists

References

External links
Mediatoon Page for Nanook's Adventures (EN)
Mediatoon Page for Nanook - The Great Combat (EN)
Planète Jeunesse's page on Nanook (FR)

1990s French animated television series
1997 French television series debuts
French children's animated adventure television series
1990s Canadian animated television series
Canadian children's animated adventure television series
Animated television series about children
Teletoon original programming